is a Japanese football player. He plays for Fujieda MYFC.

Playing career
Sho Kagami joined Shimizu S-Pulse in 2013. In June 2016, he moved to Fujieda MYFC.

References

External links

1994 births
Living people
Association football people from Shizuoka Prefecture
Japanese footballers
J1 League players
J2 League players
J3 League players
Shimizu S-Pulse players
Fujieda MYFC players
J.League U-22 Selection players
Association football forwards